Kings High School is a public high school in the unincorporated village of Kings Mills, Ohio in Deerfield Township, Warren County. It is the only high school in the Kings Local School District. Kings has been rated excellent for 10 consecutive years under Ohio academic standards. Kings High School underwent a major construction and renovation project in 2009. A wing was added with new lockers, classrooms, and a high-tech upgrade. The school's mission statement is, "Kings Local School District Empowers All Learners to Develop and Maximize Their Capacity For Success." The school's enrollment as of fall 2012 was 1,244 students.

Kings High School offers many extracurricular programs for students including an academic quiz team, art club, choir, color guard and winter guard, community service club, dance team, theatre, marching band, pep band, jazz band, drumline, symphony orchestra, the Knight Times newspaper, and yearbook. The Kings music and drama departments offer 13 extracurricular programs, with an additional 19 music clubs and/or activities. Over 90 percent of Kings graduates pursue a post-secondary education.

Athletics
The school's mascot is the Knight and its athletic teams compete in the Eastern Cincinnati Conference (ECC) as of the 2012–13 season. The Knights were previously charter members of the Fort Ancient Valley Conference (FAVC), in which they competed from 1965 to 2012.

References

External links
 School website

High schools in Warren County, Ohio
Public high schools in Ohio